Gyalpo spirits are one of the eight classes of haughty gods and spirits in Tibetan mythology and religion. Gyalpo, a word which simply means "king" in the Tibetic languages, in Tibetan mythology is used to refer to the Four Heavenly Kings and especially to a class of spirits, both Buddhist and Bon, who may be either malevolent spirits or oath-bound as dharmapalas.

Nature
Geoffrey Samuel describes these gyalpo spirits as "king-spirits" who are "the spirits of evil kings or of high lamas who have failed their vows." He also states that they are white in color. De Nebesky-Wojkowitz characterizes this type of spirit as generally red in colour and of violent character, harassing mainly lamas and religious people, but also laity and even animals. In fact, gyalpo spirits often have both white (peaceful) and red (wrathful) forms.

It is believed one can be protected against gyalpo spirits by means of appropriate rituals. In religious meditation instructions texts attributed to Padmasambhava, he warns his disciples against magical displays of this class of spirits.

Some gyalpos are believed to be bound by oath by Padmasambhava, for example Gyalpo Pehar is believed to be the main guardian of Samye, built at the time of Padmasambhava and King Trisong Detsen.

Machig Labdrön enumerated outer, inner and secret ways gyalpo spirits manifest. The outer way are very elegant temples with beautiful ornaments, crystal stupas and many offerings, rich with silver and gold, with well dressed monks giving teachings, full of charisma; their characteristic provocation is nervousness and confusion. Tulku Urgyen Rinpoche (1920–1996) wrote that as very often gyalpos manifest as masters, spiritual teachers and enlightened beings, several highly realised practitioners of the past fell for their tricks.

Gyalpo Pehar

According to Tibetan Buddhist myth, Gyalpo Pehar (] [also spelt: pe kar & dpe dkar) is the chief spirit belonging to the gyalpo class. When Padmasambhava arrived in Tibet in the eighth century, he subdued all gyalpo spirits and put them under control of Gyalpo Pehar, who promised not to harm any sentient beings and was made the chief guardian spirit of the Samye Temple built at that time. Some Tibetans believe that the protector of Samye sometimes enters the body of a medium (called the "Dharma Lord of Samye") and acts as an oracle.

Nechung Gyalpo
The Great Dharma King (rgyal chen) Nechung Dorje Drakden (rdo rje grags ldan) or Nechung Chokyong (chos skyong) is considered to be the chief minister of Gyalpo Pehar or the same as the activity aspect of Gyalpo Pehar. It is the spirit of this deity which possesses the Nechung Oracle or State Oracle of Tibet.

Notes

Sources

Tibetan Buddhist mythology
Dharmapalas